Dylan Sinclair is a Canadian rhythm and blues singer and songwriter from Toronto, Ontario, whose full-length debut album Proverb was a Juno Award nominee for Traditional R&B/Soul Recording of the Year at the Juno Awards of 2021.

Sinclair graduated from Thornlea Secondary School. Sinclair released his first EP, Red Like Crimson, in 2018. In January 2021, he was named one of the winners of SOCAN's inaugural Black Canadian Music Awards alongside Tobi, Naya Ali, RAAHiiM and Hunnah.

References

21st-century Black Canadian male singers
Canadian rhythm and blues singers
Musicians from Toronto
Living people
Year of birth missing (living people)